The 1969–70 Sussex County Football League season was the 45th in the history of Sussex County Football League a football competition in England.

Division One

Division One featured 14 clubs which competed in the division last season, along with two new clubs, promoted from Division Two:
Ringmer
Three Bridges

Also, Bexhill Town Athletic changed name to Bexhill Town after parting ways with Bexhill Amateur Athletic Club.

League table

Division Two

Division Two featured twelve clubs which competed in the division last season, along with three new clubs:
Peacehaven & Telscombe, joined from the Brighton, Hove & District League
Selsey, relegated from Division One
Wigmore Athletic, relegated from Division One

Also, Burgess Hill changed name to Burgess Hill Town.

League table

References

1969-70
S